Sir Malcolm Arnold Robertson  (2 September 1877 – 23 April 1951) was a British diplomat and politician. He was appointed Minister Plenipotentiary in Argentina in 1925, and became Ambassador to Argentina from 1927 to 1929.

Biography
Robertson entered the Civil Service after passing competitive examinations in December 1898, being appointed a clerk on the establishment of Her Majesty's Diplomatic Service on 3 January 1899. He rose steadily through the ranks, being appointed Acting Third Secretary on 1 January 1903, Second Secretary on 23 November 1905, and First Secretary on 23 November 1912. Robertson served as chargé d'affaires at Rio de Janeiro, and on 3 June 1915 was appointed a Companion of the Order of St. Michael and St. George.

In 1917 he was first secretary of the British Embassy in Washington, D.C., where in March his engagement to Gladys Ingalls,  daughter of railroad magnate Melville E. Ingalls, was announced.
Their only child, Donald Struan Robertson, served in the Scots Guards, rising to the rank of major.

On 15 September 1919 Robertson was appointed a Counsellor of Embassy in the Diplomatic Service, and on 1 December 1921 he was appointed Agent and Consul-General at Tangier, where he took a leading part in negotiating the Tangier Protocol. On 3 June 1924 Robertson, now Minister at Tangier, was made a Knight Commander of the Order of the British Empire. On 18 September 1925 he was appointed Envoy Extraordinary and Minister Plenipotentiary to the Argentine Republic, and also Minister Plenipotentiary to the Republic of Paraguay. On 26 May 1927 he became a Privy Councillor, and on 9 July 1927 was appointed Ambassador Extraordinary and Plenipotentiary to the Argentine Republic.

After retiring from the Diplomatic Service in 1930, he became Chairman of Spillers from 1930 to 1947. He was elected as Conservative MP for Mitcham in the by-election of August 1940, but lost his seat in the 1945 general election. Robertson also served as Chairman of the British Council from 1941 to 1945. In that capacity, in 1942 Robertson and R. A. Butler, President of the Board of Education, invited the ministers of education of the Allied countries to form a Conference of Allied Ministers of Education, which after the war was expanded and became the United Nations Educational, Scientific and Cultural Organization (UNESCO).

References

External links 

 The personal papers of Sir Malcolm Robertson and Robertson's day files while Chairman of the British Council are held at Churchill Archives Centre, Cambridge

1877 births
1951 deaths
Ambassadors of the United Kingdom to Argentina
Knights Grand Cross of the Order of St Michael and St George
Knights Commander of the Order of the British Empire
Members of the Privy Council of the United Kingdom
UK MPs 1935–1945
Conservative Party (UK) MPs for English constituencies
Foreign Office personnel of World War II
People of the British Council